Conus burryae, common name Mrs Burry's cone, is a species of sea snail, a marine gastropod mollusk in the family Conidae, the cone snails and their allies.

Like all species within the genus Conus, these snails are predatory and venomous. They are capable of "stinging" humans, therefore live ones should be handled carefully or not at all.

Description
The size of the shell varies between 20 mm and 35 mm.

Distribution
Locus typicus: Off Lower Matecumbe Key, Lower Florida keys.
This species occurs in the Gulf of Mexico.

Notes

References
 Clench, W. J. 1942. The Genus Conus in the Western Atlantic. Johnsonia 1(6): 1–40.
 Filmer R.M. (2001). A Catalogue of Nomenclature and Taxonomy in the Living Conidae 1758 - 1998. Backhuys Publishers, Leiden. 388pp.
 Tucker J.K. (2009). Recent cone species database. 4 September 2009 Edition
 Rosenberg, G., F. Moretzsohn, and E. F. García. 2009. Gastropoda (Mollusca) of the Gulf of Mexico, Pp. 579–699 in Felder, D.L. and D.K. Camp (eds.), Gulf of Mexico–Origins, Waters, and Biota. Biodiversity. Texas A&M Press, College Station, Texas.
 Petuch E.J. & Sargent D.M. (2011) New species of Conidae and Conilithidae (Gastropoda) from the tropical Americas and Philippines. With notes on some poorly-known Floridian species. Visaya 3(3): 37–58.
 Monnier E. & Limpalaër L. (2012) Dauciconus colombi (Gastropoda: Conidae), a new species from Martinique. Visaya 3(5): 15–19. [March 2012]
  Puillandre N., Duda T.F., Meyer C., Olivera B.M. & Bouchet P. (2015). One, four or 100 genera? A new classification of the cone snails. Journal of Molluscan Studies. 81: 1–23

External links
 The Conus Biodiversity website
 
 Cone Shells – Knights of the Sea

burryae
Gastropods described in 1942